The greater Asiatic yellow bat (Scotophilus heathii) is a species of vesper bat. It is found in Afghanistan,  Bangladesh, Cambodia, China, India, Indonesia, Laos, Myanmar, Nepal, Pakistan, Philippines, Sri Lanka, Thailand and Vietnam.

Like many bats, females have delayed ovulation, with the ability to store sperm. This makes them particularly of interest to biologists. Studies have shown that seasonal changes in hormones allow them to deposit fat before the onset of winter.

It is named after Josiah Marshall Heath, who presented the type specimen to the Zoological Society of London.

Description
The bats weighs .

Adults are yellowish bronze brown above and bright yellow to reddish below. Wing membrane is blackish brown. Short and dense fur except on neck. Muzzle is blunt, naked, and dark. Tragus is crescent-shaped and separated from the posterior margin of the pinna by a conspicuous notch. Long tailed. Young are dark grayish brown.

References

Mammals of China
Mammals of Afghanistan
Mammals of Pakistan
Mammals of Sri Lanka
Mammals of India
Scotophilus
Taxonomy articles created by Polbot
Taxa named by Thomas Horsfield
Mammals described in 1831
Bats of Asia
Bats of India